Justice Ameer Ismail is a retired Judge of the Supreme Court of Sri Lanka and a former Chairman of the Commission to Investigate Allegations of Bribery or Corruption, Sri Lanka.

Education
Justice Ameer Ismail was educated at Wesley College, Colombo, Sri Lanka.

He obtained the Bachelor of Laws degree from the University of Ceylon in 1967 and then passed out as an Advocate from the Sri Lanka Law College. He was enrolled and admitted as an Advocate of the Supreme Court of Sri Lanka in 1967.

Justice Ismail has obtained a Diploma in International Air Law from the Utrecht University, Netherlands in 1983. He has followed a course in 1998, in Dispute Resolution organized by the Institute for the Study and Development of Legal Systems in the University of California, Berkeley.

Career
He joined the Attorney-General's Department (Sri Lanka) as a Crown Counsel in 1971 after a brief period of practice in the unofficial bar. He served the Department for a period of 12 years as a State Counsel and as a Senior State Counsel.

He was absorbed into the judiciary in 1983 as a High Court Judge. After serving in various stations as a Judge of the High Court exercising original jurisdiction, he was promoted as a Judge of the Court of Appeal in 1990. He became the President of the Court of Appeal in 1998.

He was then elevated as a Judge of the Supreme Court of Sri Lanka in 1990. During his tenure as a Supreme Court Judge, he served as a Member of the Judicial Service Commission. He was also appointed a Member of the Council of Legal Education. He retired as a Supreme Court Judge in 1994.

Justice Ismail was appointed as the Chairman of the Commission to Investigate Allegations of Bribery or Corruption  by Her Excellency the President on the recommendation of the Constitutional Council in March 2005 for a period of five years ending March 2010.

References

External links
 Commission to Investigate Allegations of Bribery or Corruption, Sri Lanka
 IT Development Organization of Sammanthurai
 One Laptop Per Child (OLPC) Lanka Foundation
 Dr. A.M.A. Azeez Foundation - Memorial Orations
 

Living people
Alumni of Wesley College, Colombo
Puisne Justices of the Supreme Court of Sri Lanka
High Courts of Sri Lanka judges
Presidents of the Court of Appeal of Sri Lanka
Year of birth missing (living people)